Franz Josef Hirt (7 February 1899 – 20 May 1985) was a Swiss classical pianist.

For his commitment to contemporary French music, the French government honoured him in 1927 with the Ordre des Palmes académiques, in 1948 with the title of Knight of the Legion of Honour and in 1957 with the title of Officer of the Legion of Honour. He was appointed to the Paris École Normale de Musique by Alfred Cortot.

Hirt died in Bern at the age of 86.

External links

References 

Swiss classical pianists
20th-century pianists
Recipients of the Ordre des Palmes Académiques
Officiers of the Légion d'honneur
1899 births
1985 deaths
People from Lucerne